Josef Dobiáš (24 December 1886 in Mladá Boleslav – 31 January 1981) was a Czech chess player.

At the beginning of his career, he took 5th at Prague 1908 (B tournament), tied for 4-5th at Pilsen (Plzeň) 1911, tied for 5-7th at Breslau 1912 (the 18th DSB Congress, Hauptturnier B), took 6th at 1913 Jungbunzlau (Mladá Boleslav) 1913 (Karel Hromádka won), and took 8th at Böhmisch Trübau (Česká Třebová) 1913, and shared 1st at Brünn (Brno) 1916.

After World War I, he tied for 6-8th at Prague 1924/25 (the 1st Kautsky Memorial, Jan Schulz won), tied for 3rd-5th at Prague 1930, tied for 8-12th at Münchengrätz (Mnichovo Hradiště) 1933.

In the period between 1939 and 1945 (the Protectorate of Bohemia and Moravia), he took 12th at Rakonitz (Rakovník) 1940 (Championships of Bohemia and Moravia, won by Jan Foltys), won the Kautsky Memorial in 1940, took 12th at Chotzen (Choceň) 1942 (Miroslav Katětov won), took 6th at Prague 1943 (UJCS-17.Kongress), and took 14th at Brünn (Brno) 1944 (Karel Opočenský won).

References

1886 births
1981 deaths
Czech chess players
People from Mladá Boleslav
Chess players from the Austro-Hungarian Empire
Czechoslovak chess players